Wank'a Marka (Quechua wank'a rock, marka village, "black mountain", hispanicized spelling Huancamarca) is a mountain in the Andes of Peru, about  high. It is located in the Huánuco Region, Lauricocha Province, Jesús District. Wank'a Marka lies between the Waywash range and the Rawra mountain range, northwest of Asul Hanka and northeast of Puskan T'urpu.

References

Mountains of Peru
Mountains of Huánuco Region